Lycée Français de San Salvador "Antoine et Consuelo de Saint-Exupéry" is a French international school in Santa Tecla, El Salvador.

It serves up to the lycée/bachillerato (senior high school) level.

See also

 El Salvador–France relations

References

External links
  Lycée Français de San Salvador
  Lycée Français de San Salvador

San Salvador
International schools in El Salvador